Lorenzo Collacchioni (born 9 August 1980) is an Italian football coach and former player, last in charge of Serie D club Livorno.

Playing career
A former defender, he started his career with hometown club Fiorentina. In 2000, he was part of the deal of Marco Rossi to A.C. Fiorentina. He was valued for 1 billion lire (€516,457). However, Collacchioni joined Avellino from Salernitana in the same transfer window. Collacchioni also never returned to Serie A nor Serie B again for the rest of his career. In 2014, he joined Eccellenza  Tuscany club Porta Romana. However, in the same transfer window, he was signed by Serie D club Siena.

Coaching career
After retiring as a player, Collacchioni started a career as a coach in the amateur leagues of Tuscany.

After working as a youth coach for Fucecchio, he was promoted head coach on May 2019. After two seasons with Fucecchio, he left for fellow Eccellenza club San Miniato Basso for the 2021–22 season.

On 12 July 2022, he was unveiled as the new head coach of Livorno, originally scheduled to play Eccellenza but later readmitted to Serie D. On 31 October 2022, Collacchioni was dismissed following a 0–1 league defeat to Montespaccato, only to be called back one day later following a formal request by the team squad. Just a few days later, on 21 November, Collacchioni was however dismissed once again following a 0–3 defeat to promotion rivals Pianese.

References

External links
 Career profile by tuttocalciatori.net

1980 births
Living people
Footballers from Florence
Italian footballers
Italian football managers
Pisa S.C. players
U.S. Pistoiese 1921 players
Olbia Calcio 1905 players
A.C. Prato players
ACF Fiorentina players
A.C.N. Siena 1904 players
Serie C players
Italy youth international footballers

Association football defenders